Izsák Lőwy (also known as Isaac Lowy) (1793, Nagysurány, Kingdom of Hungary – 8 April 1847, Újpest, Kingdom of Hungary) was a Hungarian industrialist and founder of the city Újpest, now a district of Budapest, Hungary. He created the city name Újpest (New Pest). He was the leader of the Jewish community and the town's first judge. In 1866 a street was named after Izsák Lőwy in his town (next to present Újpest-Városkapu metro station).

References

1793 births
1847 deaths
Hungarian Jews
People from Újpest